Vadim Gustov (born 26 December 1948) is a Russian politician who served as first deputy prime minister of Russia from 1998 to 1999 and a regional leader.

Early life and education
Gustov was born in Kalinino, Alexandrovsky District, Vladimir Oblast in 1948. He was educated in Sweden.

Career
Gustov was the head of the Leningrad Oblast Council of People's Deputies until it was dissolved in October 1993. In 1994, he served as chairman of the Federation Council's Commonwealth of Independent States affairs committee. He was elected as the governor of Leningrad Oblast in September 1996, taking 53% of the votes. He was independent, but was supported by the Communist Party of the Russian Federation. He replaced Alexander Belyakov in the aforementioned post.

Gustov served as governor until his appointment as first deputy prime minister on 18 September 1998. He was succeeded by Valery Serdyukov as the governor of Leningrad Oblast.

Gustov, an independent politician, was one of two first deputy prime ministers in the cabinet of Yevgeny Primakov and was in charge of regional affairs and the relations with former Soviet republics. Gustov's tenure lasted until 27 April 1999 when he was removed from post by Russian President Boris Yeltsin. Gustov was succeeded by Sergei Stepashin in the post.

In the 1999 and 2003 elections Gustov ran for the governorship of Leningrad Oblast, but he lost both elections. In January 2002 he became a senator at the Federation Council, representing Vladimir Oblast. He was again the chairman of the council's CIS affairs committee during this period.

Since December 2011 Vadim Gustov is a member of the Legislative Assembly of Leningrad Oblast. He ran on the list of the United Russia party. On 4 July 2012, he was elected vice-speaker of the Legislative Assembly.

Views
Gustov was an anti-Yeltsin figure in the 1990s. He was not a communist and did not support the concept of a planned economy.

References

External links

20th-century Russian politicians
2003 Tuzla Island conflict
1948 births
Deputy heads of government of the Russian Federation
Government ministers of Russia
Governors of Leningrad Oblast
Living people
Members of the Federation Council of Russia (1994–1996)
Members of the Federation Council of Russia (1996–2000)
Members of the Federation Council of Russia (after 2000)